This Might Be the Day is the third studio album by American rapper MJG. It was released on July 15, 2008, by 404 Music and MJG Muzik.

Track listing

Charts

References

2008 albums
8Ball & MJG albums